is the 21st single by Japanese boyband Hikaru Genji, released on May 13, 1993. It was used as the theme song of the animated series Nintama Rantarō, while the B-side "Hohoemi o Azukete" was used as an insert song for the same anime.

The song has been re-used four times as the Nintama Rantarō opening theme song. The original version was used for season 1 (1993–1994), while their self cover under the name Genji Super 5 was used for seasons 2 through 9 (1994–2001). Johnny's Entertainment groups then covered the song three times: Ya-Ya-Yah (seasons 10–16, 2002–2008), Hey! Say! JUMP (season 17, 2009) and NYC (season 18, 2010).

Track listing

NYC cover

"Yūki 100%" was covered as the debut song of the Japanese boy band “NYC” (abbreviation of its three members' names, Nakayama, Yamada, and Chinen). It was released under J Storm on April 7, 2010.

The single was released in two versions. Limited edition which includes the Promotional video and the jacket shooting while the regular edition comes out  with instrumentals. The limited edition came with three NYC photo cards type A and the first press of the regular edition came with three NYC photo cards type B. "Yuuki 100%" was used as the fifth opening theme for the anime Nintama Rantaro while "Yume no Tane" its B-side was used as the 20th ending theme. It peaked at #1 on the Oricon charts and sold 120,516 copies in total in 13 weeks.

Track listing

Limited Edition
 CD
 Yuuki 100% (勇気100%)
 Yume no Tane (ゆめのタネ)
 DVD
 Recording & Jacket Shooting Off Shot (レコーディング＆ジャケット撮影オフショット)

Regular Edition
 Yuuki 100% (勇気100%)
 Yume no Tane
 Yuuki 100% (勇気100%) (Instrumental)
 Yume no Tane  (Instrumental)

Charts and certifications

Charts

Sales and certifications

References

1993 singles
2010 singles
Anime songs
Oricon Weekly number-one singles
Billboard Japan Hot 100 number-one singles
1993 songs
Songs with lyrics by Gorō Matsui
Pony Canyon singles
Nintama Rantarō